Samantha Dorrance is a British actress, singer and dancer from Willenhall in the West Midlands who reached fame on Disney Channel UK. She played the lead role of Laura in both the UK Tour and West End versions of Dreamboats and Petticoats.

Biography

Career
Samantha has entered several dancing and singing competitions, including one for the BBC children's programme, Blue Peter, which saw her get through to the semi-final live on BBC1. 

In September 2009, Samantha successfully auditioned for the part of Wendy in the pantomime Peter Pan which was performed at the brand new Theatre Severn in Shrewsbury, Shropshire from December 2009 into January 2010. She performed alongside Emmerdale star Matt Healy who played Mr Darling and Captain Hook.

She took on the lead role of Cinderella at The Theatre Severn in Shrewsbury from December 2010 to January 2011.

Between February and April 2011 Sam played the part of Tracey in a brand new play by Alan Share called Death of a Nightingale at The New End Theatre in Hampstead, London.

In 2022 she played the role of the Beauty in the Theatre Severn pantomime adaptation of Beauty and the Beast.

Discography
Studio singles/albums:
 City Life (2012)
 Going My Way (2015)

Credits
 2007 – You're The Star Competition on Disney Channel UK, winner.
 2008 – My School Musical on Disney Channel UK, presenter.
 2008 – High School Musical 3 Movie Surfers, Disney Channel US, presenter.
 2009 – Peter Pan, Spillers, Wendy.
 2010 – Cinderella, Spillers, Cinderella.
 2011 – Death of a Nightingale, Tracey.
 2011 – Dreamboats & Petticoats 2011 Tour, Laura.
 2011 – Cinderella, Spillers, Cinderella.
 2012 – Dreamboats & Petticoats 2012 Tour, Laura.
 2012 – Dreamboats & Petticoats (West End), Laura.
 2013 – Doctors, BBC1, Zoe.
 2013 – Snow White, Shone Productions, Snow White.
 2014 – Disney Dance Along, Disney Channel, Presenter.
 2014 – Dance With Disney Junior, Disney Juniors, Presenter.
 2015 – The Tale of Mr Tumble, MIF BBC CBeebies, Tootsie.
 2015 – Seussical International Tour, Sell A Door, Gertrude McFuzz.
 2015 – Aladdin, Enchanted Entertainments, Princess Jasmine.
 2016 – Peter Pan, Evolution, Wendy – Octagon Theatre, Yeovil.
 2017 – Paw Patrol LIVE, Nickelodeon/Lifelike Touring, Skye.
 2017 – Peter Pan, Evolution, Wendy – Marlowe Theatre, Canterbury.
 2018 – Doctors, BBC1, Vicky Coake.
 2018 – Justin's Band Tour, Herself.
 2018 – Lake Erie, October Films, Debbie.
 2018 – Explain With Lego, Lego, Presenter.

References

External links
Official site

British actresses
British female dancers
Year of birth missing (living people)
Living people
People from Willenhall
British women singers